Copyright infringement (at times referred to as piracy) is the use of works protected by copyright without permission for a usage where such permission is required, thereby infringing certain exclusive rights granted to the copyright holder, such as the right to reproduce, distribute, display or perform the protected work, or to make derivative works. The copyright holder is typically the work's creator, or a publisher or other business to whom copyright has been assigned. Copyright holders routinely invoke legal and technological measures to prevent and penalize copyright infringement.

Copyright infringement disputes are usually resolved through direct negotiation, a notice and take down process, or litigation in civil court. Egregious or large-scale commercial infringement, especially when it involves counterfeiting, is sometimes prosecuted via the criminal justice system. Shifting public expectations, advances in digital technology and the increasing reach of the Internet have led to such widespread, anonymous infringement that copyright-dependent industries now focus less on pursuing individuals who seek and share copyright-protected content online, and more on expanding copyright law to recognize and penalize, as indirect infringers, the service providers and software distributors who are said to facilitate and encourage individual acts of infringement by others.

Estimates of the actual economic impact of copyright infringement vary widely and depend on other factors. Nevertheless, copyright holders, industry representatives, and legislators have long characterized copyright infringement as piracy or theft – language which some U.S. courts now regard as pejorative or otherwise contentious.

Terminology

The terms piracy and theft are often associated with copyright infringement. The original meaning of piracy is "robbery or illegal violence at sea", but the term has been in use for centuries as a synonym for acts of copyright infringement. Theft, meanwhile, emphasizes the potential commercial harm of infringement to copyright holders. However, copyright is a type of intellectual property, an area of law distinct from that which covers robbery or theft, offenses related only to tangible property. Not all copyright infringement results in commercial loss, and the U.S. Supreme Court ruled in 1985 that infringement does not easily equate with theft.

This was taken further in the case MPAA v. Hotfile, where Judge Kathleen M. Williams granted a motion to deny the MPAA the usage of words whose appearance was primarily "pejorative". This list included the word "piracy", the use of which, the motion by the defense stated, serves no court purpose but to misguide and inflame the jury.

"Piracy"

The term "piracy" has been used to refer to the unauthorized copying, distribution and selling of works in copyright. The first use of the word 'pirate' itself to describe unauthorized publishing of books dates back to at least 1736, as attested to in Nathan Bailey's 1736 dictionary An Universal Etymological English Dictionary:'One who lives by pillage and robbing on the sea. Also a plagiary'The practice of labeling the infringement of exclusive rights in creative works as "piracy" predates statutory copyright law. Prior to the Statute of Anne in 1710, the Stationers' Company of London in 1557, received a royal charter giving the company a monopoly on publication and tasking it with enforcing the charter. Article 61 of the 1994 Agreement on Trade-Related Aspects of Intellectual Property Rights (TRIPs) requires criminal procedures and penalties in cases of "willful trademark counterfeiting or copyright piracy on a commercial scale." Piracy traditionally refers to acts of copyright infringement intentionally committed for financial gain, though more recently, copyright holders have described online copyright infringement, particularly in relation to peer-to-peer file sharing networks, as "piracy".

Richard Stallman and the GNU Project have criticized the use of the word "piracy" in these situations, saying that publishers use the word to refer to "copying they don't approve of" and that "they [publishers] imply that it is ethically equivalent to attacking ships on the high seas, kidnapping and murdering the people on them."

"Theft"

Copyright holders frequently refer to copyright infringement as theft, "although such misuse has been rejected by legislatures and courts". The slogan "Piracy is theft" was used beginning in the 1980s, and is still being used. In copyright law, infringement does not refer to theft of physical objects that take away the owner's possession, but an instance where a person exercises one of the exclusive rights of the copyright holder without authorization. Courts have distinguished between copyright infringement and theft. For instance, the United States Supreme Court held in Dowling v. United States (1985) that bootleg phonorecords did not constitute stolen property. Instead,

interference with copyright does not easily equate with theft, conversion, or fraud. The Copyright Act even employs a separate term of art to define one who misappropriates a copyright: '[...] an infringer of the copyright.'

The court said that in the case of copyright infringement, the province guaranteed to the copyright holder by copyright law – certain exclusive rights – is invaded, but no control, physical or otherwise, is taken over the copyright, nor is the copyright holder wholly deprived of using the copyrighted work or exercising the exclusive rights held.

"Freebooting"
The term "freebooting" has been used to describe the unauthorized copying of online media, particularly videos, onto websites such as Facebook, YouTube or Twitter. The word itself had already been in use since the 16th century, referring to pirates, and meant "looting" or "plundering". This form of the word – a portmanteau of "freeloading" and "bootlegging" – was suggested by YouTuber and podcaster Brady Haran in the podcast Hello Internet. Haran advocated the term in an attempt to find a phrase more emotive than "copyright infringement", yet more appropriate than "theft".

Motivation
Some of the motives for engaging in copyright infringement are the following:

 Pricing unwillingness or inability to pay the price requested by the legitimate sellers
 Testing and evaluation try before paying for what may be bad value
 Unavailability no legitimate sellers providing the product in the language or country of the end-user: not yet launched there, already withdrawn from sales, never to be sold there, geographical restrictions on online distribution and international shipping
 Usefulness the legitimate product comes with various means (DRM, region lock, DVD region code, Blu-ray region code) of restricting legitimate use (backups, usage on devices of different vendors, offline usage) or comes with non-skippable advertisements and anti-piracy disclaimers, which are removed in the unauthorized product, making it more desirable for the end-user
 Shopping experience no legitimate sellers providing the product with the required quality through online distribution and through a shopping system with the required level of user-friendliness
 Anonymity downloading works does not require identification whereas downloads directly from the website of the copyright owner often require a valid email address and/or other credentials
 Freedom of information opposition to copyright law in general

Sometimes only partial compliance with license agreements is the cause. For example, in 2013, the US Army settled a lawsuit with Texas-based company Apptricity which makes software that allows the army to track their soldiers in real time. In 2004, the US Army paid the company a total of $4.5 million for a license of 500 users while allegedly installing the software for more than 9000 users; the case was settled for US$50 million. Major anti-piracy organizations, like the BSA, conduct software licensing audits regularly to ensure full compliance.

Cara Cusumano, director of the Tribeca Film Festival, stated in April 2014: "Piracy is less about people not wanting to pay and more about just wanting the immediacypeople saying, 'I want to watch Spiderman right now' and downloading it". The statement occurred during the third year that the festival used the Internet to present its content, while it was the first year that it featured a showcase of content producers who work exclusively online. Cusumano further explained that downloading behavior is not merely conducted by people who merely want to obtain content for free:

I think that if companies were willing to put that material out there, moving forward, consumers will follow. It's just that [consumers] want to consume films online and they're ready to consume films that way and we're not necessarily offering them in that way. So it's the distribution models that need to catch up. People will pay for the content.

In response to Cusumano's perspective, Screen Producers Australia executive director Matt Deaner clarified the motivation of the film industry: "Distributors are usually wanting to encourage cinema-going as part of this process [of monetizing through returns] and restrict the immediate access to online so as to encourage the maximum number of people to go to the cinema." Deaner further explained the matter in terms of the Australian film industry, stating: "there are currently restrictions on quantities of tax support that a film can receive unless the film has a traditional cinema release."

In a study published in the Journal of Behavioural and Experimental Economics, and reported on in early May 2014, researchers from the University of Portsmouth in the UK discussed findings from examining the illegal downloading behavior of 6,000 Finnish people, aged seven to 84. The list of reasons for downloading given by the study respondents included money saving; the ability to access material not on general release, or before it was released; and assisting artists to avoid involvement with record companies and movie studios.

In a public talk between Bill Gates, Warren Buffett, and Brent Schlender at the University of Washington in 1998, Bill Gates commented on piracy as a means to an end, whereby people who use Microsoft software illegally will eventually pay for it, out of familiarity, as a country's economy develops and legitimate products become more affordable to businesses and consumers:

Although about three million computers get sold every year in China, people don't pay for the software. Someday they will, though. And as long as they're going to steal it, we want them to steal ours. They'll get sort of addicted, and then we'll somehow figure out how to collect sometime in the next decade.

Developing world
In Media Piracy in Emerging Economies, the first independent comparative study of media piracy focused on Brazil, India, Russia, South Africa, Mexico, Turkey and Bolivia, "high prices for media goods, low incomes, and cheap digital technologies" are the chief factors that lead to the global spread of media piracy, especially in emerging markets. According to the study, even though digital piracy inflicts additional costs on the production side of media, it also offers the main access to media goods in developing countries. The strong tradeoffs that favor using digital piracy in developing economies dictate the current neglected law enforcement's toward digital piracy.

In China as of 2013, the issue of digital infringement has not merely been legal, but social – originating from the high demand for cheap and affordable goods as well as the governmental connections of the businesses which produce such goods.

Motivations due to censorship
There have been instances where a country's government bans a movie, resulting in the spread of copied videos and DVDs.  Romanian-born documentary maker Ilinca Calugareanu wrote a New York Times article telling the story of Irina Margareta Nistor, a narrator for state TV under Nicolae Ceauşescu's regime.  A visitor from the west gave her bootlegged copies of American movies, which she dubbed for secret viewings through Romania.  According to the article, she dubbed more than 3,000 movies and became the country's second-most famous voice after Ceauşescu, even though no one knew her name until many years later.

Existing and proposed laws

Most countries extend copyright protections to authors of works. In countries with copyright legislation, enforcement of copyright is generally the responsibility of the copyright holder.  However, in several jurisdictions there are also criminal penalties for copyright infringement. According to the U.S. Chamber of Commerce's 2021 IP Index, the nations with the lowest scores for copyright protection were Vietnam, Pakistan, Egypt, Nigeria, Brunei, Algeria, Venezuela and Argentina.

Civil law
Copyright infringement in civil law is any violation of the exclusive rights of the owner. In U.S. law, those rights include reproduction, the preparation of derivative works, distributing copies by sale or rental, and public performance or display.

In the U.S., copyright infringement is sometimes confronted via lawsuits in civil court, against alleged infringers directly or against providers of services and software that support unauthorized copying. For example, major motion-picture corporation MGM Studios filed suit against P2P file-sharing services Grokster and Streamcast for their contributory role in copyright infringement. In 2005, the Supreme Court ruled in favor of MGM, holding that such services could be held liable for copyright infringement since they functioned and, indeed, willfully marketed themselves as venues for acquiring copyrighted movies. The MGM v. Grokster case did not overturn the earlier Sony v. Universal City Studios decision, but rather clouded the legal waters; future designers of software capable of being used for copyright infringement were warned.

In the United States, copyright term has been extended many times over from the original term of 14 years with a single renewal allowance of 14 years, to the current term of the life of the author plus 70 years. If the work was produced under corporate authorship it may last 120 years after creation or 95 years after publication, whichever is sooner.

Article 50 of the Agreement on Trade-Related Aspects of Intellectual Property Rights (TRIPs) requires that signatory countries enable courts to remedy copyright infringement with injunctions and the destruction of infringing products, and award damages. Some jurisdictions only allow actual, provable damages, and some, like the U.S., allow for large statutory damage awards intended to deter would-be infringers and allow for compensation in situations where actual damages are difficult to prove.

In some jurisdictions, copyright or the right to enforce it can be contractually assigned to a third party which did not have a role in producing the work. When this outsourced litigator appears to have no intention of taking any copyright infringement cases to trial, but rather only takes them just far enough through the legal system to identify and exact settlements from suspected infringers, critics commonly refer to the party as a "copyright troll". Such practices have had mixed results in the U.S.

Criminal law

Punishment of copyright infringement varies case-by-case across countries. Convictions may include jail time and/or severe fines for each instance of copyright infringement. In the United States, willful copyright infringement carries a maximum fine of $150,000 per instance.

Article 61 of the Agreement on Trade-Related Aspects of Intellectual Property Rights (TRIPs) requires that signatory countries establish criminal procedures and penalties in cases of "willful trademark counterfeiting or copyright piracy on a commercial scale". Copyright holders have demanded that states provide criminal sanctions for all types of copyright infringement.

The first criminal provision in U.S. copyright law was added in 1897, which established a misdemeanor penalty for "unlawful performances and representations of copyrighted dramatic and musical compositions" if the violation had been "willful and for profit". Criminal copyright infringement requires that the infringer acted "for the purpose of commercial advantage or private financial gain". To establish criminal liability, the prosecutor must first show the basic elements of copyright infringement: ownership of a valid copyright, and the violation of one or more of the copyright holder's exclusive rights. The government must then establish that defendant willfully infringed or, in other words, possessed the necessary mens rea. Misdemeanor infringement has a very low threshold in terms of number of copies and the value of the infringed works.

The ACTA trade agreement, signed in May 2011 by the United States, Japan, and the EU, requires that its parties add criminal penalties, including incarceration and fines, for copyright and trademark infringement, and obligated the parties to actively police for infringement.

United States v. LaMacchia 871 F.Supp. 535 (1994) was a case decided by the United States District Court for the District of Massachusetts which ruled that, under the copyright and cybercrime laws effective at the time, committing copyright infringement for non-commercial motives could not be prosecuted under criminal copyright law. The ruling gave rise to what became known as the "LaMacchia Loophole", wherein criminal charges of fraud or copyright infringement would be dismissed under current legal standards, so long as there was no profit motive involved.

The United States No Electronic Theft Act (NET Act), a federal law passed in 1997, in response to LaMacchia, provides for criminal prosecution of individuals who engage in copyright infringement under certain circumstances, even when there is no monetary profit or commercial benefit from the infringement. Maximum penalties can be five years in prison and up to $250,000 in fines. The NET Act also raised statutory damages by 50%. The court's ruling explicitly drew attention to the shortcomings of current law that allowed people to facilitate mass copyright infringement while being immune to prosecution under the Copyright Act.

Proposed laws such as the Stop Online Piracy Act broaden the definition of "willful infringement", and introduce felony charges for unauthorized media streaming. These bills are aimed towards defeating websites that carry or contain links to infringing content, but have raised concerns about domestic abuse and internet censorship.

Noncommercial file sharing

Legality of downloading
To an extent, copyright law in some countries permits downloading copyright-protected content for personal, noncommercial use. Examples include Canada and European Union (EU) member states like Poland.

The personal copying exemption in the copyright law of EU member states stems from the Information Society Directive of 2001, which is generally devised to allow EU members to enact laws sanctioning making copies without authorization, as long as they are for personal, noncommercial use. The Directive was not intended to legitimize file-sharing, but rather the common practice of space shifting copyright-protected content from a legally purchased CD (for example) to certain kinds of devices and media, provided rights holders are compensated and no copy protection measures are circumvented. Rights-holder compensation takes various forms, depending on the country, but is generally either a levy on "recording" devices and media, or a tax on the content itself. In some countries, such as Canada, the applicability of such laws to copying onto general-purpose storage devices like computer hard drives, portable media players, and phones, for which no levies are collected, has been the subject of debate and further efforts to reform copyright law.

In some countries, the personal copying exemption explicitly requires that the content being copied be obtained legitimately – i.e., from authorized sources, not file-sharing networks. In April 2014, the Court of Justice of the European Union ruled that "national legislation which makes no distinction between private copies made from lawful sources and those made from counterfeited or pirated sources cannot be tolerated."

Legality of uploading
Although downloading or other private copying is sometimes permitted, public distribution – by uploading or otherwise offering to share copyright-protected content – remains illegal in most, if not all countries. For example, in Canada, even though it was once legal to download any copyrighted file as long as it was for noncommercial use, it was still illegal to distribute the copyrighted files (e.g. by uploading them to a P2P network).

Relaxed penalties
Some countries, like Canada and Germany, have limited the penalties for non-commercial copyright infringement. For example, Germany has passed a bill to limit the fine for individuals accused of sharing movies and series to €800–900. Canada's Copyright Modernization Act claims that statutory damages for non-commercial copyright infringement are capped at C$5,000 but this only applies to copies that have been made without the breaking of any "digital lock". However, this only applies to "bootleg distribution" and not non-commercial use.

DMCA and anti-circumvention laws
Title I of the U.S. DMCA, the WIPO Copyright and Performances and Phonograms Treaties Implementation Act has provisions that prevent persons from "circumvent[ing] a technological measure that effectively controls access to a work". Thus if a distributor of copyrighted works has some kind of software, dongle or password access device installed in instances of the work, any attempt to bypass such a copy protection scheme may be actionable – though the US Copyright Office is currently reviewing anticircumvention rulemaking under DMCA – anti-circumvention exemptions that have been in place under the DMCA include those in software designed to filter websites that are generally seen to be inefficient (child safety and public library website filtering software) and the circumvention of copy protection mechanisms that have malfunctioned, have caused the instance of the work to become inoperable or which are no longer supported by their manufacturers. According to Abby House Media Inc. v. Apple Inc., it is legal to point users to DRM-stripping software and inform them how to use it because of lack of evidence that DRM stripping leads to copyright infringement.

Online intermediary liability
Whether Internet intermediaries are liable for copyright infringement by their users is a subject of debate and court cases in a number of countries.

Definition of intermediary
Internet intermediaries were formerly understood to be internet service providers (ISPs). However, questions of liability have also emerged in relation to other Internet infrastructure intermediaries, including Internet backbone providers, cable companies and mobile communications providers.

In addition, intermediaries are now also generally understood to include Internet portals, software and games providers, those providing virtual information such as interactive forums and comment facilities with or without a moderation system, aggregators of various kinds, such as news aggregators, universities, libraries and archives, web search engines, chat rooms, web blogs, mailing lists, and any website which provides access to third party content through, for example, hyperlinks, a crucial element of the World Wide Web.

Litigation and legislation concerning intermediaries
Early court cases focused on the liability of Internet service providers (ISPs) for hosting, transmitting or publishing user-supplied content that could be actioned under civil or criminal law, such as libel or pornography. As different content was considered in different legal systems, and in the absence of common definitions for "ISPs", "bulletin boards" or "online publishers", early law on online intermediaries' liability varied widely from country to country.

The debate has shifted away from questions about liability for specific content, including that which may infringe copyright, towards whether online intermediaries should be generally responsible for content accessible through their services or infrastructure.

The U.S. Digital Millennium Copyright Act (1998) and the European E-Commerce Directive (2000) provide online intermediaries with limited statutory immunity from liability for copyright infringement. Online intermediaries hosting content that infringes copyright are not liable, so long as they do not know about it and take actions once the infringing content is brought to their attention. In U.S. law this is characterized as "safe harbor" provisions. Under European law, the governing principles for Internet Service Providers are "mere conduit", meaning that they are neutral 'pipes' with no knowledge of what they are carrying; and 'no obligation to monitor' meaning that they cannot be given a general mandate by governments to monitor content. These two principles are a barrier for certain forms of online copyright enforcement and they were the reason behind an attempt to amend the European Telecoms Package in 2009 to support new measures against copyright infringement.

Peer-to-peer issues
Peer-to-peer file sharing intermediaries have been denied access to safe harbor provisions in relation to copyright infringement. Legal action against such intermediaries, such as Napster, are generally brought in relation to principles of secondary liability for copyright infringement, such as contributory liability and vicarious liability.

These types of intermediaries do not host or transmit infringing content, themselves, but may be regarded in some courts as encouraging, enabling or facilitating infringement by users. These intermediaries may include the author, publishers and marketers of peer-to-peer networking software, and the websites that allow users to download such software. In the case of the BitTorrent protocol, intermediaries may include the torrent tracker and any websites or search engines which facilitate access to torrent files. Torrent files do not contain copyrighted content, but they may make reference to files that do, and they may point to trackers which coordinate the sharing of those files. Some torrent indexing and search sites, such as The Pirate Bay, now encourage the use of magnet links, instead of direct links to torrent files, creating another layer of indirection; using such links, torrent files are obtained from other peers, rather than from a particular website.

Since the late 1990s, copyright holders have taken legal actions against a number of peer-to-peer intermediaries, such as pir, Grokster, eMule, SoulSeek, BitTorrent and Limewire, and case law on the liability of Internet service providers (ISPs) in relation to copyright infringement has emerged primarily in relation to these cases.

Nevertheless, whether and to what degree any of these types of intermediaries have secondary liability is the subject of ongoing litigation. The decentralised structure of peer-to-peer networks, in particular, does not sit easily with existing laws on online intermediaries' liability. The BitTorrent protocol established an entirely decentralised network architecture in order to distribute large files effectively. Recent developments in peer-to-peer technology towards more complex network configurations are said to have been driven by a desire to avoid liability as intermediaries under existing laws.

Limitations
Copyright law does not grant authors and publishers absolute control over the use of their work. Only certain types of works and kinds of uses are protected; only unauthorized uses of protected works can be said to be infringing.

Non-infringing uses
Article 10 of the Berne Convention mandates that national laws provide for limitations to copyright, so that copyright protection does not extend to certain kinds of uses that fall under what the treaty calls "fair practice", including but not limited to minimal quotations used in journalism and education. The laws implementing these limitations and exceptions for uses that would otherwise be infringing broadly fall into the categories of either fair use or fair dealing. In common law systems, these fair practice statutes typically enshrine principles underlying many earlier judicial precedents, and are considered essential to freedom of speech.

Another example is the practice of compulsory licensing, which is where the law forbids copyright owners from denying a license for certain uses of certain kinds of works, such as compilations and live performances of music. Compulsory licensing laws generally say that for certain uses of certain works, no infringement occurs as long as a royalty, at a rate determined by law rather than private negotiation, is paid to the copyright owner or representative copyright collective. Some fair dealing laws, such as Canada's, include similar royalty requirements.

In Europe, the copyright infringement case Public Relations Consultants Association Ltd v Newspaper Licensing Agency Ltd had two prongs; one concerned whether a news aggregator service infringed the copyright of the news generators; the other concerned whether the temporary web cache created by the web browser of a consumer of the aggregator's service, also infringed the copyright of the news generators. The first prong was decided in favor of the news generators; in June 2014 the second prong was decided by the Court of Justice of the European Union (CJEU), which ruled that the temporary web cache of consumers of the aggregator did not infringe the copyright of the news generators.

Non-infringing types of works
In order to qualify for protection, a work must be an expression with a degree of originality, and it must be in a fixed medium, such as written down on paper or recorded digitally. The idea itself is not protected. That is, a copy of someone else's original idea is not infringing unless it copies that person's unique, tangible expression of the idea. Some of these limitations, especially regarding what qualifies as original, are embodied only in case law (judicial precedent), rather than in statutes.

In the U.S., for example, copyright case law contains a substantial similarity requirement to determine whether the work was copied. Likewise, courts may require computer software to pass an Abstraction-Filtration-Comparison test (AFC Test) to determine if it is too abstract to qualify for protection, or too dissimilar to an original work to be considered infringing. Software-related case law has also clarified that the amount of R&D, effort and expense put into a work's creation does not affect copyright protection.

Evaluation of alleged copyright infringement in a court of law may be substantial; the time and costs required to apply these tests vary based on the size and complexity of the copyrighted material. Furthermore, there is no standard or universally accepted test; some courts have rejected the AFC Test, for example, in favor of narrower criteria.

Preventive measures
The BSA outlined four strategies that governments can adopt to reduce software piracy rates in its 2011 piracy study results:

 "Increase public education and raise awareness about software piracy and IP rights in cooperation with industry and law enforcement."
 "Modernize protections for software and other copyrighted materials to keep pace with new innovations such as cloud computing and the proliferation of networked mobile devices."
 "Strengthen enforcement of IP laws with dedicated resources, including specialized enforcement units, training for law enforcement and judiciary officials, improved cross-border cooperation among law enforcement agencies, and fulfillment of obligations under the World Trade Organization's Agreement on Trade-Related Aspects of Intellectual Property Rights (TRIPS)."
 "Lead by example by using only fully licensed software, implementing software asset management (SAM) programs, and promoting the use of legal software in state-owned enterprises, and among all contractors and suppliers."

Legal
Corporations and legislatures take different types of preventive measures to deter copyright infringement, with much of the focus since the early 1990s being on preventing or reducing digital methods of infringement. Strategies include education, civil and criminal legislation, and international agreements, as well as publicizing anti-piracy litigation successes and imposing forms of digital media copy protection, such as controversial DRM technology and anti-circumvention laws, which limit the amount of control consumers have over the use of products and content they have purchased.

Legislatures have reduced infringement by narrowing the scope of what is considered infringing. Aside from upholding international copyright treaty obligations to provide general limitations and exceptions, nations have enacted compulsory licensing laws applying specifically to digital works and uses. For example, in the U.S., the DMCA, an implementation of the 1996 WIPO Copyright Treaty, considers digital transmissions of audio recordings to be licensed as long as a designated copyright collective's royalty and reporting requirements are met. The DMCA also provides safe harbor for digital service providers whose users are suspected of copyright infringement, thus reducing the likelihood that the providers themselves will be considered directly infringing.

Some copyright owners voluntarily reduce the scope of what is considered infringement by employing relatively permissive, "open" licensing strategies: rather than privately negotiating license terms with individual users who must first seek out the copyright owner and ask for permission, the copyright owner publishes and distributes the work with a prepared license that anyone can use, as long as they adhere to certain conditions. This has the effect of reducing infringement – and the burden on courts – by simply permitting certain types of uses under terms that the copyright owner considers reasonable. Examples include free software licenses, like the GNU General Public License (GPL), and the Creative Commons licenses, which are predominantly applied to visual and literary works.

Protected distribution
To maximize revenue, pre-COVID-19 film distribution typically began with movie theaters (theatrical window), on average approximately 16 and a half weeks,
before the release to Blu-ray and DVD (entering its video window). During the theatrical window, digital versions of films are often transported in data storage devices by couriers rather than by data transmission. The data can be encrypted, with the key being made to work only at specific times in order to prevent leakage between screens.

Watermarking
Coded Anti-Piracy marks can be added to films to identify the source of illegal copies and shut them down. In 2006 a notable example of using Coded Anti-Piracy marks resulted in a man being arrested for uploading a screener's copy of the movie Flushed Away. Some photocopiers use Machine Identification Code dots for similar purposes. The EURion constellation on banknotes is used to prevent copying to make counterfeit currency.

Economic impact of copyright infringement
Organizations disagree on the scope and magnitude of copyright infringement's free rider economic effects and public support for the copyright regime.

The European Commission funded a study to analyze "the extent to which unauthorised online consumption of copyrighted materials (music, audiovisual, books and video games) displaces sales of online and offline legal content", across Germany, the United Kingdom, Spain, France, Poland and Sweden; the public funding behind the study provided a necessary basis for its neutrality. 30,000 users, including minors between 14 and 17 years, were surveyed among September and October 2014. While a negative impact was found for the film industry, videogame sales were positively affected by illegal consumption, possibly due to "the industry being successful in converting illegal users to paying users" and employing player-oriented strategies (for example, by providing additional bonus levels or items in the gameplay for a fee); finally, no evidence was found for any claims of sales displacement in the other market sectors. According to the European Digital Rights association, the study may have been censored: specifically, as of 2018, the European Commission has not published the results, except in the part where the film industry was found to be adversely affected by illegal content consumption. Access to the study was requested and obtained by Member of the European Parliament Felix Reda.

In relation to computer software, the Business Software Alliance (BSA) claimed in its 2011 piracy study: "Public opinion continues to support intellectual property (IP) rights: Seven PC users in 10 support paying innovators to promote more technological advances."

Following consultation with experts on copyright infringement, the United States Government Accountability Office (GAO) clarified in 2010 that "estimating the economic impact of IP [intellectual property] infringements is extremely difficult, and assumptions must be used due to the absence of data", while "it is difficult, if not impossible, to quantify the net effect of counterfeiting and piracy on the economy as a whole."

The U.S. GAO's 2010 findings regarding the great difficulty of accurately gauging the economic impact of copyright infringement was reinforced within the same report by the body's research into three commonly cited estimates that had previously been provided to U.S. agencies. The GAO report explained that the sources – a Federal Bureau of Investigation (FBI) estimate, a Customs and Border Protection (CBP) press release and a Motor and Equipment Manufacturers Association estimate – "cannot be substantiated or traced back to an underlying data source or methodology."

Deaner explained the importance of rewarding the "investment risk" taken by motion picture studios in 2014:

Usually movies are hot because a distributor has spent hundreds of thousands of dollars promoting the product in print and TV and other forms of advertising. The major Hollywood studios spend millions on this process with marketing costs rivaling the costs of production. They are attempting then to monetise through returns that can justify the investment in both the costs of promotion and production.

Motion picture industry estimates
In 2008, the Motion Picture Association of America (MPAA) reported that its six major member companies lost US$6.1 billion to piracy. A 2009 Los Angeles Daily News article then cited a loss figure of "roughly $20 billion a year" for Hollywood studios. According to a 2013 article in The Wall Street Journal, industry estimates in the United States range between $6.1B to $18.5B per year.

In an early May 2014 article in The Guardian, an annual loss figure of US$20.5 billion was cited for the movie industry. The article's basis is the results of a University of Portsmouth study that only involved Finnish participants, aged between seven and 84. The researchers, who worked with 6,000 participants, stated: "Movie pirates are also more likely to cut down their piracy if they feel they are harming the industry compared with people who illegally download music".

However, a study conducted on data from sixteen countries between 2005 and 2013, many of which had enacted anti-piracy measures to increase box office revenues of movies, found no significant increases in any markets attributable to policy interventions, which calls into doubt the claimed negative economic effects of digital piracy on the film industry.

Software industry estimates
Psion Software claimed in 1983 that software piracy cost it £2.9 million a year, 30% of its revenue. Will Wright said that Raid on Bungeling Bay sold 20,000 copies for the Commodore 64 in the US, but 800,000 cartridges for the Nintendo Famicom with a comparable installed base in Japan, "because it's a cartridge system [so] there's virtually no piracy".

According to a 2007 BSA and International Data Corporation (IDC) study, the five countries with the highest rates of software piracy were: 1. Armenia (93%); 2. Bangladesh (92%); 3. Azerbaijan (92%); 4. Moldova (92%); and 5. Zimbabwe (91%). According to the study's results, the five countries with the lowest piracy rates were: 1. the U.S. (20%); 2. Luxembourg (21%); 3. New Zealand (22%); 4. Japan (23%); and 5. Austria (25%). The 2007 report showed that the Asia-Pacific region was associated with the highest amount of loss, in terms of U.S. dollars, with $14,090,000, followed by the European Union, with a loss of $12,383,000; the lowest amount of U.S. dollars was lost in the Middle East/Africa region, where $2,446,000 was documented.

In its 2011 report, conducted in partnership with IDC and Ipsos Public Affairs, the BSA stated: "Over half of the world's personal computer users – 57 percent – admit to pirating software." The ninth annual "BSA Global Software Piracy Study" claims that the "commercial value of this shadow market of pirated software" was worth US$63.4 billion in 2011, with the highest commercial value of pirated PC software existent in the U.S. during that time period (US$9,773,000). According to the 2011 study, Zimbabwe was the nation with the highest piracy rate, at 92%, while the lowest piracy rate was present in the U.S., at 19%.

The GAO noted in 2010 that the BSA's research up until that year defined "piracy as the difference between total installed software and legitimate software sold, and its scope involved only packaged physical software."

Music industry estimates
In 2007, the Institute for Policy Innovation (IPI) reported that music piracy took $12.5 billion from the U.S. economy. According to the study, musicians and those involved in the recording industry are not the only ones who experience losses attributed to music piracy. Retailers have lost over a billion dollars, while piracy has resulted in 46,000 fewer production-level jobs and almost 25,000 retail jobs. The U.S. government was also reported to suffer from music piracy, losing $422 million in tax revenue.

A 2007 study in the Journal of Political Economy found that the effect of music downloads on legal music sales was "statistically indistinguishable from zero".

A report from 2013, released by the European Commission Joint Research Centre suggests that illegal music downloads have almost no effect on the number of legal music downloads. The study analyzed the behavior of 16,000 European music consumers and found that although music piracy negatively affects offline music sales, illegal music downloads had a positive effect on legal music purchases. Without illegal downloading, legal purchases were about two percent lower.

The study has received criticism, particularly from  the International Federation of the Phonographic Industry, which believes the study is flawed and misleading. One argument against the research is that many music consumers only download music illegally. The IFPI also points out that music piracy affects not only online music sales but also multiple facets of the music industry, which is not addressed in the study.

Media industry estimates
In a March 2019 article, The New York Times reported that the Qatar-based beIN Media Group suffered "billions of dollars" of losses, following the unilateral cancellation of an exclusive contract it shared with the Asian Football Confederation (AFC) for the past 10 years. The decision by the AFC to invalidate its license for broadcasting rights to air games in Saudi Arabia came after the kingdom was accused of leading a piracy operation through its television broadcaster, beoutQ, misappropriating sports content owned by beIN Sports since 2017, worth billions of dollars.

In January 2020, the European Commission released a report on protection and enforcement of intellectual property rights in third countries. The report named as many as 13 countries, including Argentina, Brazil, China, Ecuador, India, Indonesia, and Saudi Arabia, the last being included for the first time. The report said piracy is "causing considerable harm to EU businesses" and high economic losses have occurred in Argentina, China, Ecuador and India. It also informed Saudi Arabia has not "taken sufficient steps to stop the infringement" caused via BeoutQ, like other countries have, to minimize the extent of financial and economic loss.

Criticism of industry estimates
Some claims made by industry representatives have been criticized as overestimating the monetary loss caused by copyright infringement.
In one example, the RIAA claimed damages against LimeWire totaling $75 trillion – more than the global GDP – with the judge overseeing the case ruling that such claims were "absurd". The $75 trillion figure had been obtained by counting each song downloaded as an infringement of copyright. After the conclusion of the case, LimeWire agreed to pay $105 million to RIAA.

In another decision, US District Court Judge James P. Jones found that the "RIAA's request problematically assumes that every illegal download resulted in a lost sale", indicating profit/loss estimates were likely extremely off.

Critics of industry estimates argue that those who use peer-to-peer sharing services, or practice "piracy" are actually more likely to pay for music. A Jupiter Research study in 2000 found that "Napster users were 45 percent more likely to have increased their music purchasing habits than online music fans who don't use the software were." This indicated that users of peer-to-peer sharing did not hurt the profits of the music industry, but in fact may have increased it.

Professor Aram Sinnreich, in his book The Piracy Crusade, states that the connection between declining music sales and the creation of peer to peer file sharing sites such as Napster is tenuous, based on correlation rather than causation. He argues that the industry at the time was undergoing artificial expansion, what he describes as a perfect bubble'—a confluence of economic, political, and technological forces that drove the aggregate value of music sales to unprecedented heights at the end of the twentieth century".

Sinnreich cites multiple causes for the economic bubble, including the CD format replacement cycle; the shift from music specialty stores to wholesale suppliers of music and 'minimum advertised pricing'; and the economic expansion of 1991–2001. He believes that with the introduction of new digital technologies, the bubble burst, and the industry suffered as a result.

Economic impact of infringement in emerging markets
The 2011 Business Software Alliance Piracy Study Standard estimated the total commercial value of illegally copied software to be at $59 billion in 2010, with emerging markets accounting for $31.9 billion, over half of the total. Furthermore, mature markets for the first time received fewer PC shipments than emerging economies in 2010. In addition with software infringement rates of 68 percent comparing to 24 percent of mature markets, emerging markets thus possessed the majority of the global increase in the commercial value of counterfeit software. China continued to have the highest commercial value of such software at $8.9 billion among developing countries and second in the world behind the US at $9.7 billion in 2011. In 2011, the Business Software Alliance announced that 83 percent of software deployed on PCs in Africa had been pirated (excluding South Africa).

Some countries distinguish corporate piracy from private use, which is tolerated as a welfare service. This is the leading reason developing countries refuse to accept or respect copyright laws. Traian Băsescu, the president of Romania, stated that "piracy helped the young generation discover computers. It set off the development of the IT industry in Romania."

Pro-free-culture organizations

 Free Software Foundation (FSF)
 Open Source Initiative (OSI)
 Electronic Frontier Foundation (EFF)
 Creative Commons (CC)
 Demand Progress
 Fight for the Future
 Pirate Party
 Plan S, by major funders of scientific research

Anti-copyright-infringement organizations
 Business Software Alliance (BSA)
 Canadian Alliance Against Software Theft (CAAST)
 Entertainment Software Association (ESA)
 Federation Against Copyright Theft (FACT)
 Federation Against Software Theft (FAST)
 International Intellectual Property Alliance (IIPA)
 Copyright Alliance

See also

 Abandonware
 In re Aimster Copyright Litigation
 
 Australian copyright law
 Cable television piracy
 Center for Copyright Information
 Comparison of anti-plagiarism software
 Computer Associates Int. Inc. v. Altai Inc.
 Copyfraud
 Copyleft
 Copyright aspects of downloading and streaming
 Copyright, Designs and Patents Act 1988
 Copyrighted content on file sharing networks
 Copyright Remedy Clarification Act
 Criminal remedies for copyright infringement
 Elektra Records Co. v. Gem Electronic Distributors, Inc.
 Fair Use
 FBI
 Federation Against Copyright Theft (FACT)
 Intellectual property in China
 Internet Privacy Act
 Jacobsen v. Katzer
 Legal aspects of copyright infringement
 Missionary Church of Kopimism
 Online piracy
 Open Letter to Hobbyists
 Pirated movie release types
 Plagiarism
 Playboy Enterprises, Inc. v. Frena
 Product activation
 Public domain
 Radio music ripping
 Software copyright
 Software cracking
 Trade group efforts against file sharing
 Trans-Pacific Partnership
 Video copy detection
 Video game piracy
 Warez
 Windows Genuine Advantage
 World Anti-Piracy Observatory (WAPO)

References

Further reading

External links

 
Infringement
Organized crime
Organized crime activity
Tort law

File sharing